Earle Toussaint Audet (May 14, 1921 – December 18, 2002) was an American football offensive tackle in the National Football League for the Washington Redskins, as well as the Los Angeles Dons of the All-America Football Conference.  He played college football at the University of Southern California, where he joined Theta Chi fraternity, and was drafted in the third round of the 1944 NFL Draft.

As an actor, he played minor roles in Tahiti Honey (1943), Black Bart (1948) and All American (1953).

His wife DeDe, a graduate of Venice High School and longtime community activist and volunteer, served on Venice Town Council in the 1960s and 1970s, as President of Venice Neighborhood Council after Earl's death, on Councilwoman Ruth Galanter's Community Advisory Planning Committee, as representative to the Los Angeles Department of Water and Power committee and representative of the advisory council on the Los Angeles Neighborhood Council Coalition before retiring a second time in 2017 to move to Culver City.

Early life and education
Audet joined the Marines during the World War II era.

References

External links
 
 

1921 births
2002 deaths
American football offensive tackles
American male shot putters
Georgetown University alumni
Los Angeles Dons players
Players of American football from Providence, Rhode Island
USC Trojans football players
Washington Redskins players
United States Marines
United States Marine Corps personnel of World War II